Oharaeibacter diazotrophicus  is a Gram-negative, aerobic and motile bacteria from the genus Oharaeibacter which has been isolated from the rhizosphere of rice plants.

References

External links
Type strain of Oharaeibacter diazotrophicus at BacDive -  the Bacterial Diversity Metadatabase

Hyphomicrobiales
Bacteria described in 2017